The Rural Municipality of Elfros No. 307 is a rural municipality (RM) in the Canadian province of Saskatchewan within Census Division No. 10 and  Division No. 4. It is located in the east-central portion of the province.

History 
The RM of Elfros No. 307 incorporated as a rural municipality on December 13, 1909.

Communities and localities 
The following urban municipalities are surrounded by the RM.

Villages
Elfros

The following unincorporated communities are within the RM.

Special service areas
Leslie

Organized hamlets
Mozart

Demographics 

Government 
The RM of Elfros No. 307 is governed by an elected municipal council and an appointed administrator that meets on the second Wednesday of every month. The reeve of the RM is Norman Hall while its administrator is Krista Park. The RM's office is located in Elfros.

References 

E

Division No. 10, Saskatchewan